MacDonald v Vapor Canada Ltd, [1977] 2 S.C.R. 134 is a leading constitutional decision of the Supreme Court of Canada on the Trade and Commerce power under section 91(2) of the Constitution Act, 1867.

Background
The federal Trade-marks Act provided remedies for acts or business practices that are "contrary to honest industrial or commercial usage in Canada". The constitutionality of these provisions were challenged as ultra vires of the federal government as it created civil remedy and cause of action for tort and contractual matters which is generally under the power of the provincial authority over property and civil rights.

Federal Court of Appeal upheld the provision as valid under the Trade and Commerce power.

The Supreme Court held in a unanimous decision that the provisions were unconstitutional.

Opinion of the Court
Chief Justice Laskin, writing for the Court, found that the provisions did encroach on the province's authority over property and civil rights and could not be upheld under the trade and commerce branch. In considering the trade and commerce clause he examined the "general trade" branch of the clause first articulated in Citizen's Insurance Co. v. Parsons (1881). Laskin proposed a three-stage test for the "general trade" branch. First, there must be a "general regulatory scheme". Second, the scheme must have the "oversight of a regulatory agency", and third, the scheme must have a concern with "trade as a whole rather than a particular industry".

Aftermath
The test was later modified by General Motors v. City of National Leasing (1989).

See also
 List of Supreme Court of Canada cases (Laskin Court)

1977 in Canadian case law
Canadian federalism case law
Supreme Court of Canada cases
Supreme Court of Canada case articles without infoboxes